Bernd Schneider (born 20 July 1964) is a German racing driver. He is a five-time Deutsche Tourenwagen Masters champion, and a Mercedes Brand Ambassador.

Career

Early years
Schneider was named after legendary driver Bernd Rosemeyer, winner of the 1936 European Drivers' Championship.  Introduced to karting at an early age, he displayed an obvious talent for racing.  After several years in the junior kart series, Schneider won the 1980 German Kart championship.  Two years later, he would win the 1982 European Kart championship with the national team.  In 1983, he won the African kart championship.

Single seater racing
The next few years, Schneider would race in the various Formula Ford series in Germany and elsewhere in Europe. In 1986, he joined the German Formula Three circuit, winning the title the following year in 1987 as well as finishing third in the 1987 Macau Grand Prix. However, the small German-based squad did little to make an impression on the F1 circuit and Schneider only able to qualify for nine races out of the 32 he entered with the team (7 out of 16 with the turbo powered car in 1988 and only twice out of 16 attempts did he pre-qualify and actually qualify for a race in 1989). Schneider also briefly drove for Arrows, before leaving single seaters and racing Porsche sports cars in the early 1990s for Kremer Racing and Joest Racing, in the World Sportscar Championship and the Interserie and races such as the 24 Hours of Le Mans.

DTM championships 

In 1992, Schneider moved to the DTM (German Touring Car Championship), driving for AMG-Mercedes.  Finishing third his first season, he has since been a regular Mercedes driver.  In 1995, he won his first DTM championship, piloting an AMG C-Class.

In the years of the DTM's absence, Schneider raced the works Mercedes CLK GTR cars in the FIA GT Championship, winning the title in 1997 after winning six races. In 1998, now with the CLK-LM variant, although winning five races with teammate Mark Webber, he lost the title to teammates Klaus Ludwig and Ricardo Zonta. He was also a Mercedes works driver in the 24 Hours of Le Mans in 1998 and 1999.

The DTM returned in 2000 with silhouette bodies and V8 engines, and Schneider took the championship crown three of the first four years (2000, 2001, and 2003) in an AMG CLK-Class; he was runner up in 2002.  Still driving for AMG, Schneider has won a record four championships; in 2005, he was teammates with (among others) former F1 champion Mika Häkkinen, and in 2006 won his fifth championship title.

It was announced on 21 October 2008 that Schneider will retire from racing at the conclusion of the 2008 season.

Post-DTM 

In recent years, Schneider has returned from retirement to take part in several endurance races. In 2013 he raced in and won the 24 Hours of Dubai, the Bathurst 12 Hour, the 24 Hours Nürburgring and the Spa 24 Hours in a Mercedes-Benz SLS AMG.

Schneider currently races in the Pro-Am class of the Blancpain Sprint Series in the #70 GT Russian Team Viatti Mercedes.

Personal life 
Schneider lives in Monte Carlo with his girlfriend Svenja and their daughter Lilly-Sophie. He also has children Lisa-Marie and Luca Maximilian with his ex-wife Nicole, Oliver Bierhoff's older sister.  Schneider still enjoys karting.

Racing record

Career summary

Complete Formula One results
(key)

Complete World Touring Car Championship results
(key) (Races in bold indicate pole position) (Races in italics indicate fastest lap)

* Overall race position shown. Registered WTCC points paying position may differ.

Complete Deutsche Tourenwagen Meisterschaft/Masters results
(key) (Races in bold indicate pole position) (Races in italics indicate fastest lap)

 - Shanghai was a non-championship round.
† — Retired, but was classified as he completed 90% of the winner's race distance.

Complete International Touring Car Championship results
(key) (Races in bold indicate pole position) (Races in italics indicate fastest lap)

Complete 24 Hours of Le Mans results

Complete FIA GT Championship results

Complete Blancpain GT Series Sprint Cup results

References

External links 

 Bernd Schneider homepage

German expatriates in Monaco
German racing drivers
German Formula One drivers
Zakspeed Formula One drivers
Arrows Formula One drivers
German Formula Three Championship drivers
1964 births
Living people
People from Sankt Ingbert
Deutsche Tourenwagen Masters drivers
Deutsche Tourenwagen Masters champions
24 Hours of Le Mans drivers
World Touring Car Championship drivers
Racing drivers from Saarland
World Sportscar Championship drivers
Blancpain Endurance Series drivers
24 Hours of Spa drivers
WeatherTech SportsCar Championship drivers
24H Series drivers
FIA GT Championship drivers
ADAC GT Masters drivers
Mercedes-AMG Motorsport drivers
Team Joest drivers
HWA Team drivers
Karting World Championship drivers
Porsche Motorsports drivers
Nürburgring 24 Hours drivers